Harpa amouretta, common name the lesser harp, is a species of sea snail, a marine gastropod mollusk in the family Harpidae, the harp snails.

Description
As Harpa harpa, up to 7 cm, with 11–14 axial ribs and higher spire. Colour white with cream and pale brown banding. Columella with large, central purple blotch; aperture white.

The ovate shell is oblong. It is rather small and slightly elongated. The whorls of the spire are distinct and mucronated (= ending in an abruptly tapering point). The body whorl has eleven or twelve narrow and slightly elevated longitudinal ribs, the surface of which, of a yellow ground, is crossed transversely by a great number of very fine blackish lines, which approach alternately, two by two. The intervals of the ribs are marked with very thin and delicate longitudinal striae, and with brown and whitish lines undulating in bars. Sometimes one or two whitish bands are observed upon the body whorl. The aperture is ovate, alike whitish, with several small brown bands upon the edge of the outer lip which, externally, is covered by the last rib. The columella is almost straight and is marked with small brown spots.

Distribution
This marine species occurs in the Red Sea; in the Indian Ocean from Northern Transkei, South Africa to East Africa (Somalia, Tanzania, Mozambique, Kenya, Madagascar), off the Mascarene Basin, Aldabra, Chagos, Reunion, Seychelles; in the Indo-West Pacific; off New Zealand and Australia (Northern Territory, Queensland, Western Australia). There are insufficient records to support a continuous distribution across northern Australia.

Habitat
Shallow and deep sands.

References

 Röding, P.F. 1798. Museum Boltenianum sive Catalogus cimeliorum e tribus regnis naturae quae olim collegerat Joa. Hamburg : Trappii 199 pp.
 Link, H.F. 1807. Beschreibung der Naturalien Sammlung der Universität zu Rostock. Rostock : Alders Erben.
 Schumacher, C.F. 1817. Essai d'un Nouveau Systéme des Habitations des vers Testacés. Copenhagen : Schultz 287 pp., pls 1–22. 
 Lamarck, J.B.P.A. de M. 1822. Histoire naturelle des Animaux sans Vertèbres. Paris : J.B. Lamarck Vol. 7 711 pp. 
 Krauss, F. 1848. Die Südafrikanischen Mollusken. Ein Beitrag zur Kenntniss der Mollusken des Kap – und Natallandes und zur geographischen Verbreitung derselben. Stuttgart : Ebner & Seubert 140 pp. 6 pls.
 Adams, A. 1854. Descriptions of new species of shells, in the collection of Hugh Cuming, Esq. Proceedings of the Zoological Society of London 21: 173–176 
 Sowerby, G.B. II, 1860. Thesaurus Conchyliorum, or monographs of genera of shells. London : Sowerby Vol. III.
 Maes, V.O. 1967. The littoral marine mollusks of Cocos-Keeling Islands (Indian Ocean). Proceedings of the Academy of Natural Sciences, Philadelphia 119: 93–217
 Wilson, B.R. & Gillett, K. 1971. Australian Shells: illustrating and describing 600 species of marine gastropods found in Australian waters. Sydney : Reed Books 168 pp.
 Rehder, H.A. 1973. The family Harpidae of the world. Indo-Pacific Mollusca 3(16): 207–274 
 Kay, E.A. 1979. Hawaiian Marine Shells. Reef and shore fauna of Hawaii. Section 4 : Mollusca. Honolulu, Hawaii : Bishop Museum Press Bernice P. Bishop Museum Special Publication Vol. 64(4) 653 pp. 
 Walls, J.G. (1980). Conchs, tibias and harps. A survey of the molluscan families Strombidae and Harpidae. T.F.H. Publications Ltd, Hong Kong.
 Wilson, B. 1994. Australian Marine Shells. Prosobranch Gastropods. Kallaroo, WA : Odyssey Publishing Vol. 2 370 pp.

External links
 

Harpidae
Gastropods described in 1798